Of the twenty-four teams in the 1997 Rugby World Cup Sevens, three were automatically qualified: 1993 champions England, runners-up Australia and hosts Hong Kong. The other twenty-one slots were contested by sixty-four national teams in three tournaments: Lisbon, Dubai and Punta del Este, with the quarterfinalists of the first two tournaments, then the semifinalists and Plate winner of the third advancing. Through qualifying through their tournaments, Cook Islands, Morocco, Portugal and Zimbabwe all made their first World Cup appearance.

Qualifier 1: Lisbon

Day 1

Pool A
{| class="wikitable" style="text-align: center;"
|-
!width="120"|Teams
!width="40"|Pld
!width="40"|W
!width="40"|D
!width="40"|L
!width="40"|PF
!width="40"|PA
!width="40"|+/−
!width="40"|Pts
|-
|align=left|
|2||2||0||0||153||0||+153||6
|-
|align=left|
|2||1||0||1||19||90||−71||4
|-
|align=left|
|2||0||0||2||10||92||−82||2
|}

Pool B
{| class="wikitable" style="text-align: center;"
|-
!width="120"|Teams
!width="40"|Pld
!width="40"|W
!width="40"|D
!width="40"|L
!width="40"|PF
!width="40"|PA
!width="40"|+/−
!width="40"|Pts
|-
|align=left|
|2||2||0||0||165||0||+165||6
|-
|align=left|
|2||1||0||1||31||111||−80||4
|-
|align=left|
|2||0||0||2||19||104||−85||2
|}

Pool C
{| class="wikitable" style="text-align: center;"
|-
!width="120"|Teams
!width="40"|Pld
!width="40"|W
!width="40"|D
!width="40"|L
!width="40"|PF
!width="40"|PA
!width="40"|+/−
!width="40"|Pts
|-
|align=left|
|2||2||0||0||83||3||+80||6
|-
|align=left|
|2||1||0||1||69||24||+45||4
|-
|align=left|
|2||0||0||2||0||125||−125||2
|}

Pool D
{| class="wikitable" style="text-align: center;"
|-
!width="120"|Teams
!width="40"|Pld
!width="40"|W
!width="40"|D
!width="40"|L
!width="40"|PF
!width="40"|PA
!width="40"|+/−
!width="40"|Pts
|-
|align=left|
|2||2||0||0||105||12||+93||6
|-
|align=left|
|2||1||0||1||22||91||−69||4''
|-
|align=left|
|2||0||0||2||19||43||−24||2|}Pool E{| class="wikitable" style="text-align: center;"
|-
!width="120"|Teams
!width="40"|Pld
!width="40"|W
!width="40"|D
!width="40"|L
!width="40"|PF
!width="40"|PA
!width="40"|+/−
!width="40"|Pts
|-
|align=left|
|2||2||0||0||78||0||+78||6|-
|align=left|
|2||1||0||1||36||35||+1||4|-
|align=left|
|2||0||0||2||0||79||−79||2|}Pool F{| class="wikitable" style="text-align: center;"
|-
!width="120"|Teams
!width="40"|Pld
!width="40"|W
!width="40"|D
!width="40"|L
!width="40"|PF
!width="40"|PA
!width="40"|+/−
!width="40"|Pts
|-
|align=left|
|2||2||0||0||118||19||+99||6|-
|align=left|
|2||1||0||1||47||66||−19||4|-
|align=left|
|2||0||0||2||14||94||−80||2|}Pool G{| class="wikitable" style="text-align: center;"
|-
!width="120"|Teams
!width="40"|Pld
!width="40"|W
!width="40"|D
!width="40"|L
!width="40"|PF
!width="40"|PA
!width="40"|+/−
!width="40"|Pts
|-
|align=left|
|2||2||0||0||131||0||+131||6|-
|align=left|
|2||1||0||1||52||62||−10||4|-
|align=left|
|2||0||0||2||5||126||−121||2|}Pool H{| class="wikitable" style="text-align: center;"
|-
!width="120"|Teams
!width="40"|Pld
!width="40"|W
!width="40"|D
!width="40"|L
!width="40"|PF
!width="40"|PA
!width="40"|+/−
!width="40"|Pts
|-
|align=left|
|2||2||0||0||94||12||+82||6|-
|align=left|
|2||1||0||1||41||59||−18||4|-
|align=left|
|2||0||0||2||24||88||−64||2|}

Day 2Pool A{| class="wikitable" style="text-align: center;"
|-
!width="120"|Teams
!width="40"|Pld
!width="40"|W
!width="40"|D
!width="40"|L
!width="40"|PF
!width="40"|PA
!width="40"|+/−
!width="40"|Pts
|-bgcolor=ccffcc
|align=left|
|2||2||0||0||155||10||+145||6|-
|align=left|
|2||1||0||1||36||66||−30||4|-
|align=left|
|2||0||0||2||0||115||−115||2|}Pool B{| class="wikitable" style="text-align: center;"
|-
!width="120"|Teams
!width="40"|Pld
!width="40"|W
!width="40"|D
!width="40"|L
!width="40"|PF
!width="40"|PA
!width="40"|+/−
!width="40"|Pts
|-bgcolor=ccffcc
|align=left|
|2||2||0||0||80||10||+70||6|-
|align=left|
|2||1||0||1||38||43||−5||4|-
|align=left|
|2||0||0||2||10||75||−65||2|}Pool C{| class="wikitable" style="text-align: center;"
|-
!width="120"|Teams
!width="40"|Pld
!width="40"|W
!width="40"|D
!width="40"|L
!width="40"|PF
!width="40"|PA
!width="40"|+/−
!width="40"|Pts
|-bgcolor=ccffcc
|align=left|
|2||2||0||0||136||7||+129||6|-
|align=left|
|2||1||0||1||12||84||−72||4|-
|align=left|
|2||0||0||2||14||71||−57||2|}Pool D{| class="wikitable" style="text-align: center;"
|-
!width="120"|Teams
!width="40"|Pld
!width="40"|W
!width="40"|D
!width="40"|L
!width="40"|PF
!width="40"|PA
!width="40"|+/−
!width="40"|Pts
|-bgcolor=ccffcc
|align=left|
|2||2||0||0||68||14||+54||6|-
|align=left|
|2||1||0||1||50||26||+24||4|-
|align=left|
|2||0||0||2||12||90||−78||2|}Pool E{| class="wikitable" style="text-align: center;"
|-
!width="120"|Teams
!width="40"|Pld
!width="40"|W
!width="40"|D
!width="40"|L
!width="40"|PF
!width="40"|PA
!width="40"|+/−
!width="40"|Pts
|-bgcolor=ccffcc
|align=left|
|2||2||0||0||87||19||+68||6|-
|align=left|
|2||1||0||1||31||45||−14||4|-
|align=left|
|2||0||0||2||24||78||−54||2|}Pool F{| class="wikitable" style="text-align: center;"
|-
!width="120"|Teams
!width="40"|Pld
!width="40"|W
!width="40"|D
!width="40"|L
!width="40"|PF
!width="40"|PA
!width="40"|+/−
!width="40"|Pts
|-bgcolor=ccffcc
|align=left|
|2||2||0||0||119||17||+102||6|-
|align=left|
|2||1||0||1||38||61||−23||4|-
|align=left|
|2||0||0||2||15||94||−79||2|}Pool G{| class="wikitable" style="text-align: center;"
|-
!width="120"|Teams
!width="40"|Pld
!width="40"|W
!width="40"|D
!width="40"|L
!width="40"|PF
!width="40"|PA
!width="40"|+/−
!width="40"|Pts
|-bgcolor=ccffcc
|align=left|
|2||2||0||0||70||14||+56||6|-
|align=left|
|2||1||0||1||49||28||+21||4|-
|align=left|
|2||0||0||2||7||84||−77||2|}Pool H{| class="wikitable" style="text-align: center;"
|-
!width="120"|Teams
!width="40"|Pld
!width="40"|W
!width="40"|D
!width="40"|L
!width="40"|PF
!width="40"|PA
!width="40"|+/−
!width="40"|Pts
|-bgcolor=ccffcc
|align=left|
|2||2||0||0||141||0||+141||6|-
|align=left|
|2||1||0||1||61||61||+0||4|-
|align=left|
|2||0||0||2||0||141||−141||2|}

Qualifier 2: Dubai

Day 1Pool A{| class="wikitable" style="text-align: center;"
|-
!width="120"|Teams
!width="40"|Pld
!width="40"|W
!width="40"|D
!width="40"|L
!width="40"|PF
!width="40"|PA
!width="40"|+/−
!width="40"|Pts
|-
|align=left|
|2||2||0||0||96||12||+84||6|-
|align=left|
|2||1||0||1||50||29||+21||4|-
|align=left|
|2||0||0||2||3||108||−105||2|}Pool B{| class="wikitable" style="text-align: center;"
|-
!width="120"|Teams
!width="40"|Pld
!width="40"|W
!width="40"|D
!width="40"|L
!width="40"|PF
!width="40"|PA
!width="40"|+/−
!width="40"|Pts
|-
|align=left|
|2||2||0||0||127||5||+122||6|-
|align=left|
|2||1||0||1||24||97||−73||4|-
|align=left|
|2||0||0||2||19||78||−59||2|}Pool C{| class="wikitable" style="text-align: center;"
|-
!width="120"|Teams
!width="40"|Pld
!width="40"|W
!width="40"|D
!width="40"|L
!width="40"|PF
!width="40"|PA
!width="40"|+/−
!width="40"|Pts
|-
|align=left|
|2||2||0||0||78||7||+71||6|-
|align=left|
|2||1||0||1||26||47||−21||4|-
|align=left|
|2||0||0||2||12||62||−50||2|}Pool D{| class="wikitable" style="text-align: center;"
|-
!width="120"|Teams
!width="40"|Pld
!width="40"|W
!width="40"|D
!width="40"|L
!width="40"|PF
!width="40"|PA
!width="40"|+/−
!width="40"|Pts
|-
|align=left|
|2||2||0||0||108||14||+94||6|-
|align=left|
|2||1||0||1||68||31||+37||4|-
|align=left|
|2||0||0||2||0||131||−131||2|}Pool E{| class="wikitable" style="text-align: center;"
|-
!width="120"|Teams
!width="40"|Pld
!width="40"|W
!width="40"|D
!width="40"|L
!width="40"|PF
!width="40"|PA
!width="40"|+/−
!width="40"|Pts
|-
|align=left|
|2||2||0||0||146||5||+141||6|-
|align=left|
|2||1||0||1||19||64||−45||4|-
|align=left|
|2||0||0||2||5||101||−96||2|}Pool F{| class="wikitable" style="text-align: center;"
|-
!width="120"|Teams
!width="40"|Pld
!width="40"|W
!width="40"|D
!width="40"|L
!width="40"|PF
!width="40"|PA
!width="40"|+/−
!width="40"|Pts
|-
|align=left|
|2||2||0||0||93||5||+88||6|-
|align=left|
|2||1||0||1||36||43||−7||4|-
|align=left|
|2||0||0||2||10||91||−81||2|}Pool G{| class="wikitable" style="text-align: center;"
|-
!width="120"|Teams
!width="40"|Pld
!width="40"|W
!width="40"|D
!width="40"|L
!width="40"|PF
!width="40"|PA
!width="40"|+/−
!width="40"|Pts
|-
|align=left|
|2||2||0||0||45||5||+40||6|-
|align=left|
|2||1||0||1||46||7||+39||4|-
|align=left|
|2||0||0||2||0||79||−79||2|}Pool H{| class="wikitable" style="text-align: center;"
|-
!width="120"|Teams
!width="40"|Pld
!width="40"|W
!width="40"|D
!width="40"|L
!width="40"|PF
!width="40"|PA
!width="40"|+/−
!width="40"|Pts
|-
|align=left| Arabian Gulf
|2||2||0||0||45||29||+16||6|-
|align=left|
|2||1||0||1||51||31||+20||4|-
|align=left|
|2||0||0||2||22||58||−36||2|}

Day 2Pool A{| class="wikitable" style="text-align: center;"
|-
!width="120"|Teams
!width="40"|Pld
!width="40"|W
!width="40"|D
!width="40"|L
!width="40"|PF
!width="40"|PA
!width="40"|+/−
!width="40"|Pts
|-bgcolor=ccffcc
|align=left|
|2||2||0||0||85||21||+64||6|-
|align=left|
|2||1||0||1||31||38||−7||4|-
|align=left|
|2||0||0||2||5||62||−57||2|}Pool B{| class="wikitable" style="text-align: center;"
|-
!width="120"|Teams
!width="40"|Pld
!width="40"|W
!width="40"|D
!width="40"|L
!width="40"|PF
!width="40"|PA
!width="40"|+/−
!width="40"|Pts
|-bgcolor=ccffcc
|align=left|
|2||2||0||0||126||7||+119||6|-
|align=left|
|2||1||0||1||40||66||−26||4|-
|align=left|
|2||0||0||2||7||100||−93||2|}Pool C{| class="wikitable" style="text-align: center;"
|-
!width="120"|Teams
!width="40"|Pld
!width="40"|W
!width="40"|D
!width="40"|L
!width="40"|PF
!width="40"|PA
!width="40"|+/−
!width="40"|Pts
|-bgcolor=ccffcc
|align=left|
|2||2||0||0||111||21||+90||6|-
|align=left|
|2||1||0||1||31||71||−40||4|-
|align=left|
|2||0||0||2||12||62||−50||2|}Pool D{| class="wikitable" style="text-align: center;"
|-
!width="120"|Teams
!width="40"|Pld
!width="40"|W
!width="40"|D
!width="40"|L
!width="40"|PF
!width="40"|PA
!width="40"|+/−
!width="40"|Pts
|-bgcolor=ccffcc
|align=left|
|2||2||0||0||69||0||+69||6|-
|align=left|
|2||1||0||1||19||37||−18||4|-
|align=left|
|2||0||0||2||13||64||−51||2|}Pool E{| class="wikitable" style="text-align: center;"
|-
!width="120"|Teams
!width="40"|Pld
!width="40"|W
!width="40"|D
!width="40"|L
!width="40"|PF
!width="40"|PA
!width="40"|+/−
!width="40"|Pts
|-bgcolor=ccffcc
|align=left|
|2||2||0||0||157||5||+152||6|-
|align=left|
|2||1||0||1||55||68||−13||4|-
|align=left|
|2||0||0||2||12||151||−139||2|}Pool F{| class="wikitable" style="text-align: center;"
|-
!width="120"|Teams
!width="40"|Pld
!width="40"|W
!width="40"|D
!width="40"|L
!width="40"|PF
!width="40"|PA
!width="40"|+/−
!width="40"|Pts
|-bgcolor=ccffcc
|align=left|
|2||2||0||0||93||17||+76||6|-
|align=left|
|2||1||0||1||60||41||+19||4|-
|align=left|
|2||0||0||2||19||114||−95||2|}Pool G{| class="wikitable" style="text-align: center;"
|-
!width="120"|Teams
!width="40"|Pld
!width="40"|W
!width="40"|D
!width="40"|L
!width="40"|PF
!width="40"|PA
!width="40"|+/−
!width="40"|Pts
|-bgcolor=ccffcc
|align=left|
|2||2||0||0||41||6||+35||6|-
|align=left|
|2||1||0||1||45||28||+17||4|-
|align=left|
|2||0||0||2||13||65||−52||2|}Pool H{| class="wikitable" style="text-align: center;"
|-
!width="120"|Teams
!width="40"|Pld
!width="40"|W
!width="40"|D
!width="40"|L
!width="40"|PF
!width="40"|PA
!width="40"|+/−
!width="40"|Pts
|-bgcolor=ccffcc
|align=left|
|2||2||0||0||92||19||+73||6|-
|align=left| Arabian Gulf
|2||1||0||1||53||42||+11||4|-
|align=left|
|2||0||0||2||14||98||−84||2|}

Qualifier 3: Punta del Este

Day 1Pool A{| class="wikitable" style="text-align: center;"
|-
!width="160"|Teams
!width="40"|Pld
!width="40"|W
!width="40"|D
!width="40"|L
!width="40"|PF
!width="40"|PA
!width="40"|+/−
!width="40"|Pts
|-bgcolor=ccccff
|align=left|
|3||2||0||1||87||33||+54||7|-bgcolor=ccccff
|align=left|
|3||2||0||1||68||26||+42||7|-bgcolor=ccccff
|align=left|
|3||2||0||1||50||19||+31||7|-
|align=left|
|3||0||0||3||0||127||−127||3|}Pool B{| class="wikitable" style="text-align: center;"
|-
!width="160"|Teams
!width="40"|Pld
!width="40"|W
!width="40"|D
!width="40"|L
!width="40"|PF
!width="40"|PA
!width="40"|+/−
!width="40"|Pts
|-bgcolor=ccccff
|align=left|
|3||3||0||0||174||15||+159||9|-
|align=left|
|3||2||0||1||34||81||−47||7|-
|align=left|
|3||1||0||2||27||108||−81||5|-
|align=left|
|3||0||0||3||33||74||−41||3|}Pool C{| class="wikitable" style="text-align: center;"
|-
!width="160"|Teams
!width="40"|Pld
!width="40"|W
!width="40"|D
!width="40"|L
!width="40"|PF
!width="40"|PA
!width="40"|+/−
!width="40"|Pts
|-bgcolor=ccccff
|align=left|
|3||3||0||0||125||5||+120||9|-bgcolor=ccccff
|align=left|
|3||2||0||1||92||67||+25||7|-
|align=left|
|3||1||0||2||57||59||−2||5|-
|align=left|
|3||0||0||3||19||162||−143||3|}Pool D{| class="wikitable" style="text-align: center;"
|-
!width="160"|Teams
!width="40"|Pld
!width="40"|W
!width="40"|D
!width="40"|L
!width="40"|PF
!width="40"|PA
!width="40"|+/−
!width="40"|Pts
|-bgcolor=ccccff
|align=left|
|3||3||0||0||109||12||+97||9|-bgcolor=ccccff
|align=left|
|3||2||0||1||58||43||+15||7|-
|align=left|
|3||1||0||2||60||62||−2||5|-
|align=left|
|3||0||0||3||22||132||−110||3|}

Day 2Pool A{| class="wikitable" style="text-align: center;"
|-
!width="160"|Teams
!width="40"|Pld
!width="40"|W
!width="40"|D
!width="40"|L
!width="40"|PF
!width="40"|PA
!width="40"|+/−
!width="40"|Pts
|-bgcolor=ccffcc
|align=left|
|3||3||0||0||142||14||+128||9|-bgcolor=ccffcc
|align=left|
|3||2||0||1||71||53||+18||7|-bgcolor=ccccff
|align=left|
|3||1||0||2||27||99||−72||5|-bgcolor=ccccff
|align=left|
|3||0||0||3||22||96||−74||3|}Pool B{| class="wikitable" style="text-align: center;"
|-
!width="160"|Teams
!width="40"|Pld
!width="40"|W
!width="40"|D
!width="40"|L
!width="40"|PF
!width="40"|PA
!width="40"|+/−
!width="40"|Pts
|-bgcolor=ccffcc
|align=left|
|3||3||0||0||83||0||+83||9|-bgcolor=ccffcc
|align=left|
|3||1||1||1||36||66||−30||6|-bgcolor=ccccff
|align=left|
|3||1||0||2||43||57||−14||5|-bgcolor=ccccff
|align=left|
|3||0||1||2||33||72||−39||4|}PlateCup'''

References

Rugby World Cup Sevens qualification
World Cup Qualifier Sevens